This table displays the top-rated primetime television series of the 2018–19 season, as measured by Nielsen Media Research.

References

2018 in American television
2019 in American television
2018-related lists
2019-related lists
Lists of American television series